Thiruthalvaadi (The Revisionist) is a 1992 Malayalam film written by Kaloor Dennis and directed by Viji Thampi. The film stars Siddique, Jagadish, Jagathy Sreekumar, Urvashi and Sivaranjini in the main roles. The basic plot was based on the 1982 Tamil movie Manal Kayiru, directed by Visu.

Plot
Vishnu (Siddique) is the regional manager in a travel company and he is a bachelor. His friends and relatives try to get him married, but Vishnu has seven conditions for his future wife, including ones such as knowing Carnatic music, Hindi, Chinese and western cooking. So his friend Krishnankutty (Jagadish) does many cunning things to make Vishnu marry Lathika (Urvashi). After that, they both marry. But the real problems begin there.

Cast
Siddique as Vishnu Menon, regional manager in Private company
Jagadish as Krishnankutty, Vishnu's best friend and company staff
Jagathy Sreekumar as V. G. Kurup, Vishnu's brother-in-law
Urvashi as Lathika, Vishnu's wife
Sivaranjani as Indhu, Krishnakutty's lover and KSRTC bus conductor
Zeenath as Parvathy Kurup, Vishnu's sister
A. C. Zainuddin as Dayanandan, Vishnu's office staff
Rizabawa as Wilfred and Staff Accountant
Manu Varma as Office staff
Beena Antony as Office staff
Kunchan as Vaasu
Thesni Khan as Sudha 
Jagannathan as Chekkattu Velukutty Bhagavathar
Viji Thampi as Avatar Singh
V. M. Vinu as serial director
Sankaradi as Raghavan Master, Lathika's father
Oduvil Unnikrishnan as KSRTC checking inspector
Sukumari as Doctor

Music
Lyrics: Gireesh Puthenchery
"Neelayaamini" (male) - K. J. Yesudas
"Thankakkasavaniyum" - KJ Yesudas, KS Chithra
"Manchaadi Choppu Minungum"" - Sidhique, KS Chithra
"Neelayaamini" (female) - KS Chithra

External links 
 
 

1990s Malayalam-language films
Films directed by Viji Thampi
Films scored by S. P. Venkatesh